Lawrence Ralph Van Gelder (February 17, 1933 – March 11, 2016) was an American journalist and instructor in journalism who worked at several different New York City-based newspapers in his long career. Until 2010, he was senior editor of the Arts and Leisure weekly section of The New York Times, as well as a film critic.  Among the newspapers for which Van Gelder worked were the New York Daily Mirror, the New York Journal-American and the World-Journal-Tribune.

Biologist Richard Van Gelder was his brother and Gordon Van Gelder, the editor and publisher of The Magazine of Fantasy & Science Fiction, a nephew. Van Gelder graduated from Columbia University in 1953 (Columbia College (New York) and Columbia Law School). He began working at the Times in May 1967.

Lawrence Van Gelder died of leiomyosarcoma on March 11, 2016, aged 83.

References

External links

1933 births
2016 deaths
American male journalists
American people of Dutch descent
Columbia Law School alumni
Critics employed by The New York Times
The New York Times editors
Deaths from cancer in New York (state)
Deaths from leiomyosarcoma
20th-century American journalists
Columbia College (New York) alumni